Film Quarterly, a journal devoted to the study of film, television, and visual media, is published by University of California Press. It publishes scholarly analyses of international and Hollywood cinema as well as independent film, including documentary and animation. The journal also revisits film classics; examines television and digital and online media; reports from international film festivals; reviews recent academic publications; and on occasion addresses installations, video games and emergent technologies.  It welcomes established scholars as well as emergent voices that bring new perspectives to bear on visual representation as rooted in issues of diversity, race, lived experience, gender, sexuality, and transnational histories. Film Quarterly brings timely critical and intersectional approaches to criticism and analyses of visual culture. 

Since 2013, it has been edited by B. Ruby Rich. Working with her are associate editor Rebecca Prime, assistant editor Marc Francis, book reviews editor Carla Marcantonio, and Quorum editor Girish Shambu. Since 2015, Film Quarterly has received funding from the Ford Foundation’s JustFilms initiative to “support the journal’s work in advancing criticism, analysis, and reporting with particular attention to social justice documentary and the interrogation of cinema practices across genres and platforms” with an emphasis on the representation of diversity and new voices.

History 
Film Quarterly was first published in 1945 as Hollywood Quarterly, was renamed The Quarterly of Film, Radio, and Television in 1951, and has operated under its current title since 1958.

Hollywood Quarterly (1945–1951) 
According to former Film Quarterly editorial board member Brian Henderson, “Hollywood Quarterly was launched in 1945 as a joint venture of the Hollywood Writers Mobilization and the University of California Press. The association began as a wartime collaboration between educators and media workers in response to social needs occasioned by the war.” Notable members of its first editorial board were playwright and screenwriter John Howard Lawson, psychologist Franklin Fearing, and writer-director Abraham Polonsky.

Quarterly of Film, Radio, and Television (1951–1958) 
After allegations in a House of Un-American Activities Committee hearing that Hollywood Quarterly had communist leanings, in 1951, the journal changed its name to Quarterly of Film, Radio, and Television. This name change inaugurated the journal’s clear divorce from the Hollywood industry with which it had partnered for several years. The journal’s turn towards “politically safe” work in the following years led to editorial discord and instability until August Frugé, then-director of UC Press, changed the direction of the journal. Frugé drew inspiration from the European film journals Sight and Sound and Cahiers du cinéma, noting in his book that, "there was no American review comparable to these two, intellectual but not academic and devoted to film as art and not as communication. By accident we found ourselves with the means to publish one—if we chose and if we knew how."

Film Quarterly (1958–present) 
Under the editorial guidance and visionary leadership of Ernest Callenbach, the journal rebranded itself to bridge film criticism and scholarship, and was renamed Film Quarterly in Fall 1958. Its initial advisory board was composed of, among others, film scholar Andries Deinum; Gavin Lambert, a former editor of Sight and Sound who was then a screenwriter in Hollywood; Albert Johnson, a Bay Area-based film programmer and critic; and Colin Young, who taught film at UCLA and later became the first director of the British National Film and Television School. Ernest Callenbach remained Film Quarterly’s editor until the Fall 1991 issue; he had overseen the production of 133 issues by the end of his appointment.

Ann Martin, who had worked as an editor at American Film and The New Yorker, and on various film and video productions, served as the editor of Film Quarterly during 1991–2006. Rob White, who had edited the British Film Institute’s BFI Classics series, was in charge during 2006–2012. David Sterritt took over as guest editor for volume 66 in 2012–13.

Immediately following its 40th anniversary, the University of California Press published a Film Quarterly anthology of its groundbreaking essays, co-edited by Brian Henderson and then-editor Ann Martin. Editorial board members Leo Baudry, Ernest Callenbach, Albert Johnson, Marsha Kinder, and Linda Williams all participated in the conceptualization of the volume. In 2002, Ann Martin and Eric Smoodin (who was then the Film, Media, and Philosophy Acquisitions Editor at UC Press) co-edited a volume of highlights from the journal’s Hollywood Quarterly (1945–1951) years.

In 2013, film critic and historian B. Ruby Rich took over as editor for the journal. Rich's editorial vision has particularly emphasized work that engages with fresh approaches to film in a shifting digital media environment and a broadened view of cultural and critical approaches for both historical and contemporary work. Film Quarterly has emphasized the shifting forms and meanings the moving image has taken in the digital age and worked to expand its views of the field and the writers included in its pages. Special dossiers have focused on Joshua Oppenheimer’s ground-breaking The Act of Killing, the cinema of Richard Linklater, the significance of Brazilian documentarian Edouardo Coutinho, the legacy of Chantal Akerman, and a collection of Manifestos for the current era. Cover stories have focused on such films and television series as Melvin Van Peebles' The Watermelon Man, Louis Massiah's The Bombing of Osage Avenue, Jill Soloway's Transparent, and Kenya Barris's Black-ish. Film Quarterly aims to widens the scope of voices published in its pages, creates a shared discourse for divergent platforms, and broadens the canon beyond traditional auteurism.

Pauline Kael's involvement 
For a brief time in the 1950s, Pauline Kael was considered for the role of editor. She was then a programmer at the Cinema Guild, a repertory movie house in Berkeley, CA. Frugé and Kael did not share the same vision so the position was subsequently offered to Callenbach instead. Beginning in 1961, a regular feature, "Films of the Quarter," appeared in which a group of well-known film critics—Dwight Macdonald, Stanley Kauffmann, Pauline Kael, Jonas Mekas, and Gavin Lambert—discussed what they viewed as the best films of the prior three months. In the Spring 1963 issue, Pauline Kael famously attacked Andrew Sarris’ auteur theory in her landmark article, "Circles and Squares." In the Summer 1963 issue, Sarris responded to Kael’s critique with his own article, "The Auteur Theory and the Perils of Pauline."

Kael included many of her articles, film reviews, and other material published in FQ during 1961–65 in her first book, I Lost It at the Movies (1965).

Notable contributors 

 André Bazin 
 David Bordwell 
 Noël Carroll 
 Manthia Diawara 
 Richard Dyer 
 Umberto Eco 
 Miriam Hansen
 Pauline Kael 
 Laura Mulvey 
 Bill Nichols 
 B. Ruby Rich 
 Jonathan Rosenbaum 
 Andrew Sarris 
 Paul Schrader 
 Parker Tyler 
 Linda Williams

See also
 List of film periodicals

References

Further reading 
 Frugé, August. 1993. A Skeptic Among Scholars: August Frugé on University Publishing. Berkeley: University of California Press.
 Henderson, Brian, Ann Martin, and Lee Amazonas. 1999. Film Quarterly: Forty Years, a Selection. Berkeley: University of California Press.
 Smoodin, Eric Loren, and Ann Martin. 2002. Hollywood Quarterly: Film Culture in Postwar America, 1945–1957. Berkeley: University of California

External links
 Website (UC Press)
 Journal Website

Publications established in 1945
Film studies journals
Television studies journals
Media studies journals
University of California Press academic journals